(December 8, 1868 – September 18, 1927) was a Japanese writer and philosopher.

Biography 
Tokutomi was born on December 8, 1868 in Minamata, Japan to a samurai family. He was the younger brother of journalist and historian Tokutomi Sohō. He converted to Christianity in 1885, and moved to Imabari, Ehime, where he lived with Shiro Sokabe and was a student of Tokio Yokoi. This is also where he received the nickname "Roka". He later attended Doshisha University.

He wrote for newspapers owned by his brother, Sohō, until his novel The Cuckoo, was published and became successful enough that Tokutomi could make a living as a writer on his own. It was translated 15 times between 1904 and 1918, and is one of the first Japanese works to be widely translated and distributed internationally.

After meeting Leo Tolstoy, Tokutomi became inspired to move to the countryside. Their correspondence is on display in the small museum located in the Roka Kōshun-en Park, along with belongings.

From February 27, 1907 until his death, he lived in a house in Musashino (Setagaya, Tokyo, Japan). After his wife's death the property was donated to the City of Tokyo to be used as a park. It was named Roka Kōshun-en in his honor.

Tokutomi died on September 18, 1927, in Ikaho, Gunma, one day after reconciling with Sohō.

Selected bibliography

References

External links 

 
 Nami-Ko, English translation by Sakae Shioya & E.F. Edgett (1904)(pdf)

19th-century Japanese novelists
20th-century Japanese novelists
Tolstoyans
People from Imabari, Ehime
People from Minamata, Kumamoto
Writers from Kumamoto Prefecture
Japanese Christians
1868 births
1927 deaths
Doshisha University alumni
19th-century pseudonymous writers
20th-century pseudonymous writers